Good Movie is San Diego, California-based singer-songwriter Greg Laswell's debut release. The album was his first release following the dissolution of his band Shillglen in late 2001. Good Movie won a San Diego Music Award for Best Local Recording in 2004. It was released on All the Rest Records, a now-defunct label owned and operated by Laswell before he founded his current label, 20 Inch Records.

Track listing
All songs written by Greg Laswell.

 "Bright Ideas" – 5:59
 "Back to June" – 3:44
 "Carry Me Through" – 4:38
 "Tirade" – 3:53
 "19" Life" – 4:40
 "7:00 AM" – 0:44
 "Good Movie" – 4:53
 "Head for Today" – 5:21
 "Father of Your Billies" – 4:09
 "Circle Around Again" – 4:03
 "You So Bright" – 4:24
 "New Day" – 5:58
 "Me First" – 4:33

Greg Laswell albums
2003 debut albums